Kekaula Kaniho is an American football safety who is a free agent. He played college football at Boise State University.

College career
In 2020, he became the first Boise State player to ever win the Senior CLASS Award.

Professional career
Kaniho signed by the Arizona Cardinals as an undrafted free agent after the 2022 NFL Draft. He was waived on May 16, 2022.

References

External links
 Boise State Broncos bio

Year of birth missing (living people)
Living people
People from Honolulu County, Hawaii
Players of American football from Hawaii
American football defensive backs
Boise State Broncos football players
Arizona Cardinals players